Recruit Training Command, Great Lakes (RTC Great Lakes), is a unit within the United States Navy primarily responsible for conducting the initial orientation and indoctrination of incoming recruits, also known as boot camp and recruit training, or RTC. It is part of Naval Service Training Command. It is a tenant command of Naval Station Great Lakes in the city of North Chicago, Illinois, in Lake County, north of Chicago.

Called "The Quarterdeck of the Navy" since it opened in July 1911, RTC Great Lakes has been the service's only enlisted basic training location since 1994, when the Recruit Training Command in Orlando, Florida, was closed under the BRAC process. The similar RTC San Diego, California, was closed the previous year.

All enlistees into the U.S. Navy begin their service at RTC Great Lakes with at least ten weeks of training, and more if they do not pass certain tests. Upon completion of basic training, qualifying sailors are sent to various apprenticeship, or "A schools", located across the United States for training in their occupational speciality, or ratings. Those who have not yet received a specific rating enter the fleet with a general designation of airman, fireman, construction man or seaman.

History 

After the Spanish–American War, the U.S. Navy began investigating 37 sites around Lake Michigan for a new training center in the Midwest, an area that contributed 43 percent of the Navy's recruits at the time.

The main proponent of the North Chicago location was Illinois Congressional Representative and chairman of the Committee on Naval Affairs (1900–1911) George Edmund Foss, later called "The Father of Great Lakes". Foss Park, just north of the base, is named in his honor. It is likely the facility would have been located elsewhere had it not been for the $175,000 contribution of the Merchants Club of Chicago to purchase the land.

Rear Admiral Albert A. Ross was the station's first commander and the base's Ross Field and Ross Auditorium were later named in his honor. The first flag was planted on site on 1 July 1905. President William H. Taft dedicated the station six years later on 28 October 1911. In that same year, the station received its first trainee, Seaman Recruit Joseph W. Gregg.

Naval Station Great Lakes was at the forefront of the racial integration of the Navy. African-Americans were permitted to enlist for general service in the middle of 1942 receiving training at Great Lakes as well as Hampton, Virginia. Previously they had been restricted to special duties. The Navy commissioned its first African-American officers, later known as the "Golden Thirteen", at Great Lakes in February 1944. In July 1987, building 1405, the Golden Thirteen Recruit In-Processing Center, was dedicated in their honor. The surviving eight attended the ceremony.

Navy recruit training is now exclusively conducted at Naval Station Great Lakes' Recruit Training Command. Prior to the mid-1990s, recruit training facilities included Naval Training Center Orlando and Naval Training Center San Diego. Female recruit training was previously limited to the Orlando facility. The Base Realignment and Closure Commission of 1993 resulted in the consolidation of recruit training to Great Lakes. Following the consolidation, the Navy undertook a massive recapitalization (recap) program to upgrade the Great Lakes Recruit Training facility. The recap included the construction of Camp John Paul Jones, a  site on land formerly owned by the Veterans Administration Hospital adjacent to Camp Porter. New barracks were also constructed and are referred to as "ships" by the recruits. Each "ship" was also named after an important ship in naval history, such as USS John F. Kennedy and USS Enterprise. Each "ship" can house up to 1,300 recruits during training.

A  Arleigh Burke-class destroyer simulator called USS Trayer (BST-21) was also constructed as part of the recap program also known as Battle Stations 21 (BST 21).

Facilities

USS Enterprise (BLDG 7115) 

The USS Enterprise Recruit Barracks Building is the eighth of fourteen built as part of a $763 million recapitalization program.

The building is named after the eight USS Enterprises that have borne the name, including the two famous aircraft carriers pictured around the building's quarterdeck. The first is CV-6, which was a ship of the Yorktown class launched in 1936 (the most decorated Navy ship in history) and one of only three American carriers commissioned prior to World War II to survive the war. The nautical flags hanging on the quarterdeck of BLDG 7115 are from CV-6. The second is CVN-65, the world's first nuclear-powered aircraft carrier. Many of the displays on the quarterdeck of USS Enterprise (BLDG 7115) were donated by USS Enterprise (CVN-65).

The USS Enterprise (BLDG 7115) has  of space, enough to accommodate 16 recruit divisions of up to 88 recruits each. This facility integrates berthing, classrooms, learning resource centers, a galley, and a quarterdeck, all under one roof. Each "ship" has a ship's officer who fills the role of commanding officer, a ship's leading chief petty officer who fills the role of command master chief, and a chaplain.

USS Triton Recruit Barracks (Ship 12)

USS Triton Recruit Barracks (Ship 12) was dedicated in ceremonies held on 25 June 2004. Triton Hall is the fifth barracks constructed under the RTC Recapitalization Project, covering 172,000 square feet (15,979 square meters) in floor space. The facility is designed to accommodate 1056 recruits, and it includes berthing, classrooms, learning resource centers, a galley, a quarterdeck, and a modern HVAC system. On 17 May 2012, in a dedication ceremony, the long-missing ship's bell was added to the collection of artifacts in Recruit Training Command's USS Triton recruit barracks quarterdeck (pictured).

Training timeline

Processing Week 

U.S. Navy recruits begin their journey at Building 1405, Golden Thirteen, the Recruit In-processing Center in Camp Moffett. Recruits arrive at all hours, but mostly during the night. Before formal training starts, recruits are screened medically, dentally, and administratively. They receive inoculations, an initial issue of uniforms, and their first military haircut. They are taught basic grooming standards, the Uniform Code of Military Justice (UCMJ), and standards of conduct; and are introduced to their recruit division commander (drill instructor).

This first week of training, called P-days (processing days), lasts about five days but can run a little longer depending on weekends, holidays, and the schedule of arriving recruits. During P-days, recruits are taught the basics of watch standing, are given information to memorize, and begin learning to organize their equipment. Around their fifth day of training, recruits must pass their baseline Physical Fitness Assessment. Those who fail will be set back in training and offered a few more opportunities to pass. Should they still fail, they will be separated/discharged from the Navy. P-days conclude with a commissioning ceremony, led by the recruits' group commander (ship's leading chief petty officer), in which each division's guidon (divisional flag with division number) is unrolled. This ceremony marks the official start of their training.

Week One 

This week is considered the most intense week of physical conditioning. Recruits take their initial swim qualification test and learn military drill, the details of rank and rating, and the Navy core values.

Week Two 
During Week Two, recruits learn the Navy chain of command, custom and courtesies, and basic watchstanding.

Week Three 

Week Three consists of hands-on training. Recruits learn laws of armed conflict, personal finance, basic seamanship, shipboard communication, and Navy ship and aircraft identification. Recruits also take their first physical training test, performing as many sit-ups and push-ups as they can in two minutes and running  for time. The time standards for the run and the number of push-ups and sit-ups are based on the recruits' ages, which range from 17 to 34. Recruits receive their first paychecks.

Week Four 
Week Four mostly consists of weapons training. Recruits gain familiarity with the M9 pistol. Some time during the week, recruits receive a classroom lecture on firearms safety and operation of the M9. Recruits receive live-fire training with the M9. Recruits no longer receive training with the M500 shotgun or the M16 rifle.

In past years, U.S. Navy recruits trained with the M16 rifle and the M500 shotgun. All U.S. Navy training on the M16 or M500 occurs at other locations. In the 1960s and 70s, recruits drilled and marched with 1903 Springfield bolt-action rifles. Learned to operate and load the M1 Garand of WW2-fame, but at the indoor rifle range shot .22 single-shot rifles eight times.

Week Five 

Week Five consists of learning more drill instructions needed for the military drill assessment. Week Five is also called "Service Week", previously as this was when new recruits take over the daily chores necessary to keep the base running. However, since the redesign of RTC recruits no longer participate in all aspects of daily chores. It has kept its moniker because this is the most inspection and test intensive week.

Week Six 

During Week Six, recruits learn shipboard damage control and firefighting skills. Recruits will learn to escape smoke-filled compartments, open and close watertight doors, use self-contained breathing apparatus (SCBAs), carry fire hoses and learn to extinguish fires. Week Six also includes the Confidence Chamber (tear gas chamber).

Week Seven 

Week Seven is the last week of Navy Basic Training. These seven weeks, combined with Processing Week, make up the approximate eight-week training cycle that each recruit must complete before graduating. Week seven includes a comprehensive test of the material covered by Navy Basic Training in a 12-hour exercise called "Battle Stations". This reinforces much of the instruction learned during Basic Training. Recruits must pass all the requirements of Basic Training to participate in "Battle Stations". This marks the recruit's graduation and entrance into the United States Navy. Navy Basic Training is now 10 weeks long.

References

External links 

 
 U.S. Navy Basic Training Prep Site
 Navy.com Overview
 About.com article on Navy Basic Training
 Camp Moffett - Design Immerses Recruits In Patriotism, Navy Story
 Official USS Enterprise (BLDG 7115) Navy Video

Shore commands of the United States Navy
United States Navy schools and training
Military units and formations in Illinois
Education in Lake County, Illinois
North Chicago, Illinois
World War II sites in the United States
1911 establishments in Illinois